Khemissa is a town and commune in Souk Ahras Province in north-eastern Algeria.
It is the location of Thubursicum Numidarum, a well-preserved Roman theater.

References

Communes of Souk Ahras Province
Souk Ahras Province